Baní is a capital town of the Peravia Province, Dominican Republic. It is the commercial and manufacturing center in the southern region of Valdesia. The town is located 65 km south of the capital city Santo Domingo.

Baní is the headquarters of the Southcentral General Directorate of the National Police, the Central Regional Directorate of the Ministry of Agriculture and the South Regional Directorate of the General Directorate of Traffic Safety and Land Transport (DIGESETT).

Overview 
The city of Bani is the capital of the Peravia province; its residents also know it as the home of poets. The province's population is 169,865 people, with 61,864 living in the Bani metro area. This is a tightly knit community with families and neighborhoods dating back several centuries.

Bani is a Taino word meaning "abundant water." The area was named after an important Taino leader of the Maguana people. He was said to be one of Caonabo's closest allies. But, it wasn't until 1764 when a group of neighbors concerned with their security and safety came together to purchase a property large enough to build their own village in the valley of Bani. Historians set the sum of this purchase as that of “300 pesos fuertes” for a property called Cerro Gordo; the principals were listed as Francisco Baez and Bartolome del Castillo.

Its culture and customs were most accurately portrayed in the novel Bani o Engracia y Antoñita, written by Francisco Gregorio Billini. The town's original design follows the classic Spanish square, with a park in the center of the town surrounded by the local church and the local government (mayor's office).

The city's Patron Saint is "Nuestra Señora de Regla," whose celebration is on 21 November each year.

Baní is surrounded by many smaller towns, many with their own specific identities. One example is Paya, well known around the country for its milk-based candies (most famously "Dulce de Leche," or Milk Candy.) Another is Salinas, a town by the Salinas bay, where salt is produced. Salinas is famous for its Sand Dunes, that make the Dominican Republic the country with the largest sand dunes in the Caribbean.

Climate
Owing to its location in the rain shadow of the trade winds, Baní has a relatively dry tropical savanna climate (Köppen Aw) with a pronounced dry season between December and April.

People from Baní 
 Willy Aybar – Baseball player
 Erick Aybar – Baseball player
 Manny Aybar – Baseball player
 José Bautista (pitcher) (born 1964) - Dominican Major League Baseball pitcher
 Rafael Cabral, Listin Diario, the main newspaper of the Dominican Republic, Director
 Luis Castillo – Baseball player
 Mario Encarnación – Baseball player
Wander Franco – Baseball player
 Máximo Gómez y Báez –Highest ever ranking officer "Generalissimo"  Military leader in Cuba's War of Independence. First ever nominated for the Cuban presidency in 1901.
 Cristian Guzman - Baseball player 
 Gilberto Hernández Ortega – painter
 Rafael Landestoy, Baseball player
 Juan Melo - Baseball player
 Timo Pérez – Baseball player
 José Ramírez - Baseball player
 Santaye – singer-songwriter
 Mario Melvin Soto, Baseball player
 Miguel Tejada – Baseball player
 Robinson Tejeda – Baseball player
 Juan Uribe – Baseball player
 Carlos Valdéz – Baseball player
 Luis Vizcaíno – Baseball player
 Pedro Baez - Baseball player

Miscellaneous 
Baní is known for its Mangos "mamellitos"
Baní is one of the places where the Pulitzer Prize winning novel The Brief Wondrous Life of Oscar Wao  takes place.
The Internationally acclaimed Bachata singers Aventura began their career singing at small clubs gigs in Baní.

References 

Populated places in Peravia Province
Municipalities of the Dominican Republic
1764 establishments in the Spanish Empire
Populated places established in 1764